The Anthem of Yucatán was officially adopted on September 15, 1867. The lyrics of the state anthem were composed by Manuel Palomeque and the music composed by Jacinto Cuevas. The Anthem of Yucatán was the first state anthem in Mexico (the second was the state of Veracruz). During almost all the 20th century, the anthem was sung in schools.

On In mid-2000, after many years of not being heard at an official ceremony, the Anthem of Yucatán was heard in the fifth governance report of then Governor Víctor Cervera Pacheco. Some media called it a political campaign of the then governor against then President Vicente Fox Quesada.

Similarly there was a resurgence of the Flag of the Republic of Yucatán, which made its appearance in several places and items such as stickers (attached to motor vehicles and homes), cups, mugs, clothing and caps. Also by order of the Ministry of Public Education in Yucatán the anthem began to be sung again in schools. Currently, the flag of Yucatán still appears in public acts but has not been officialized.

Lyrics 
Short version:

This anthem refers to the victory of the Republic over the Empire imposed after the Second French intervention in Mexico and the execution of Maximiliano of Habsburgo in Cerro de las Campanas in the state of Querétaro.

See also 
 Second Mexican Empire
 Maximilian I of Mexico
 French intervention in Mexico
 Republic of Yucatán

References

External links 
 

1867 songs
Yucatán
Second French intervention in Mexico
Yucatán